Dameisha Beach is one of the largest beaches in Shenzhen, China. It is located on the northern shore of Mirs Bay along the Yantian District coastline and was opened to public in 1999. A Sheraton resort is located next to the beach.

Economy
Vanke is headquartered in Vanke Center (万科中心) in Dameisha.

Gallery

See also
List of parks in Shenzhen

References

Beaches of China
Geography of Shenzhen
Yantian District